Martin T. Smith (May 19, 1934 – February 26, 2015) was an American lawyer and politician.

From Poplarville, Mississippi, Smith attended Pearl River Community College and then received his bachelor's degree from the University of Mississippi and his law degree from the University of Mississippi School of Law. He then practiced law in Poplarville. From 1968 to 1988, Smith served in the Mississippi State Senate.

Notes

1934 births
2015 deaths
People from Poplarville, Mississippi
University of Mississippi alumni
University of Mississippi School of Law alumni
Mississippi lawyers
Mississippi state senators
20th-century American lawyers